Andy Bell may refer to:

Andy Bell (entrepreneur), AJ Bell Chief Executive
Andy Bell (boxer) (born 1985), British professional boxer
Andy Bell (footballer, born 1956), English footballer
Andy Bell (footballer, born 1984), English footballer
Andy Bell (freestyle motocross rider) (born 1975), Canadian freestyle motocross rider
Andy Bell (journalist) (born 1963), British journalist
Andy Bell (musician) (born 1970), English musician
Andy Bell (singer) (born 1964), English singer with synth pop band Erasure
Andy Bell (Scottish footballer)

See also
 Andrew Bell (disambiguation)
 Andy Bull, Australian alt-pop singer-songwriter and record producer